Homework is a 1991 Mexican drama film directed by Jaime Humberto Hermosillo. It was entered into the 17th Moscow International Film Festival where it won a Special Mention. The film was selected as the Mexican entry for the Best Foreign Language Film at the 64th Academy Awards, but was not accepted as a nominee.

Cast
 José Alonso as Marcelo / Pepe
 María Rojo as Virginia / Maria

See also
 List of submissions to the 64th Academy Awards for Best Foreign Language Film
 List of Mexican submissions for the Academy Award for Best Foreign Language Film

References

External links
 

1990s erotic drama films
1991 drama films
1991 films
1990s Spanish-language films
Mexican erotic drama films
One-shot films
1990s Mexican films